Sherwyn Arthur Thorson (May 10, 1940 – April 6, 2016) was a Canadian football player who played for the Winnipeg Blue Bombers. He won the Grey Cup with them in 1962. He played college football and wrestled at heavyweight with the University of Iowa, placing 2nd in 1960 and 1st in 1962. Thorson is a member of the Iowa Wrestling Hall of Fame (2007) and University of Iowa Athletics Hall of Fame (2011). He died of cancer in 2016.

References

1940 births
Winnipeg Blue Bombers players
2016 deaths